Khelaram Chakrabarty (c. 16th century) was a Bengali poet and is considered the one of the earliest poet of Dharmamangalkavya tradition.  His poem, Gourkavya, which is now available only in fragments, was written in 1527. It is assumed by the historians that he lived at Badangunge village near Arambagh in modern-day Hooghly district in the Indian state of Paschimbanga (West Bengal).

References

16th-century Bengali poets
Bengali male poets
People from Hooghly district
Bengali Hindus
Bengali-language writers
Poets from West Bengal